Kirkstall Abbey is a ruined Cistercian monastery in Kirkstall, north-west of Leeds city centre in West Yorkshire, England. It is set in a public park on the north bank of the River Aire. It was founded c. 1152. It was disestablished during the Dissolution of the Monasteries under Henry VIII.

The picturesque ruins have been drawn and painted by artists such as J. M. W. Turner, Thomas Girtin and John Sell Cotman.

Kirkstall Abbey was acquired by the Leeds Corporation as a gift from Colonel North and opened to the public in the late 19th century. The gatehouse became a museum, which is now part of the Leeds Museums & Galleries group.

Foundation
Henry de Lacy (1070, Halton, – 1123), Lord of the manor of Pontefract, 2nd Lord of Bowland, promised to dedicate an abbey to the Virgin Mary should he survive a serious illness. He recovered and agreed to give the Abbot of Fountains Abbey land at Barnoldswick in the West Riding of Yorkshire (now in Lancashire) on which to found a daughter abbey. Abbot Alexander with twelve Cistercian monks from Fountains went to Barnoldswick and after demolishing the existing church attempted to build the abbey on Henry de Lacy's land. They stayed for six years but found the place inhospitable. Abbot Alexander set about finding a more suitable place for the abbey and came across a site in the heavily wooded Aire Valley occupied by hermits.

Alexander sought help from de Lacy who was sympathetic and helped acquire the land from William de Poitou. The monks moved from Barnoldswick to Kirkstall displacing the hermits, some of whom joined the abbey, the rest being paid to move. The buildings were mostly completed between 1152 when the monks arrived in Kirkstall and the end of Alexander's abbacy in 1182. Millstone Grit for building came from Bramley Fall on the opposite side of the river.

Buildings 

The English Cistercian houses, of which there are remains at Fountains, Rievaulx, Kirkstall, Tintern and Netley were mainly arranged after the same plan, with slight local variations. As an example, below is the groundplan of Kirkstall Abbey, one of the best preserved.

The church is of the Cistercian type, with a short chancel (3), and transepts (4) with three eastward chapels to each, divided by solid walls. The building is plain, the windows are unornamented, and the nave (1) has no triforium. The windows and doorways have round heads, whereas the vaulting arches are pointed and the moldings and capitals also show early Gothic features. During the 15th century, the great east window was replaced with a smaller one. The tower over the crossing was made higher in the 16th century, just before dissolution.

The cloister to the south (5) occupies the whole length of the nave. On the east side stands the two-aisled chapter house (7), between which and the south transept is a small sacristy, and on the other side two small apartments, one of which was probably the parlour (8). Beyond this is the calefactory or day-room of the monks. Above this whole range of building runs the monks' dormitory, opening by stairs into the south transept of the church.

On the south side of the cloister (5) there are the remains of the old refectory, running, as in Benedictine houses, from east to west, and the new refectory (12), which, with the increase of the inmates of the house, superseded it, stretching, as is usual in Cistercian houses, from north to south. Adjacent to this apartment are the remains of the kitchen, pantry and buttery. The arches of the lavatory are to be seen near the refectory entrance. The western side of the cloister is occupied by vaulted cellars, supporting on the upper story the dormitory of the lay brothers (9).

 Nave
 Tower
 Presbytery
 North and south transepts
 Cloister
 Library (part of east range, with 7 & 8)
 Chapter house (part of east range, with 6 & 8)
 Parlour (part of east range, with 6 & 7)
Lay brothers' dormitory
 Reredorter
 The Lane/ malt house
 Refectory
 Warming house
 (unknown)
 Novices' quarter
 Abbot's lodgings
 Visiting abbot's lodgings
 Infirmary

Extending from the south-east angle of the main group of buildings are the walls and foundations of a secondary group of buildings (17, 18). These have been identified as the hospitium or the abbot's house, but they occupy the position in which the infirmary is more usually found. The hall was a very spacious apartment, measuring 83 ft. in length by 48 ft. 9 inches in breadth, which was divided by two rows of columns. The fish-ponds lay between the monastery and the river to the south. The abbey mill was situated about 80 yards to the north-west. The millpool may be distinctly traced, together with the goit or mill stream.

Dissolution and later history 

On 22 November 1539 the abbey was surrendered to Henry VIII's commissioners in the Dissolution of the monasteries. It was awarded to Thomas Cranmer in 1542, but reverted to the crown when Cranmer was executed in 1556. Sir Robert Savile purchased the estate in 1584, and it remained in his family's hands for almost a hundred years. In 1671 it passed into the hands of the Brudenell family, the Earls of Cardigan. Much of the stone was removed for re-use in other buildings in the area, including the steps leading to the river bank by Leeds Bridge, in the town centre.

During the 18th century the picturesque ruins attracted artists of the Romantic movement and were painted by artists including J. M. W. Turner, John Sell Cotman and Thomas Girtin. In 1889 the abbey was sold to Colonel John North, who presented it to Leeds City Council. The Council undertook a major restoration project and the abbey was opened to the public in 1895.

The African American novelist William Wells Brown visited Kirkstall Abbey in 1851, writing about his experience. Using poetry and poetic language, he described the 'pensive beauty' of the desolate ruins in their 'pastoral luxuriance' showing his appreciation of British literature as well as an interest in nature and local history.

The abbey today 

The abbey is a Grade I listed building and scheduled ancient monument. After a £5.5 million renovation programme there is a new visitor centre with interactive exhibits which illustrates the history of the abbey and the lives of the monks. Entry to the Abbey itself is via the visitor centre – £5, but with a donation box. Occasionally, guided tours are available (free of charge).

The Leeds Shakespeare Festival, performed by the British Shakespeare Company, took place annually in the cloisters from 1995 until 2009. The abbey grounds are a public park, and are used for occasional events such as the annual Kirkstall Festival and the Kirkstall Fantasia open-air concerts.

On the other side of the main road, the Grade II* listed former abbey gatehouse now forms the Abbey House Museum.

The Abbey was also used on 19 March 2011 for the live BBC Three event Frankenstein's Wedding... Live in Leeds. A live music drama starring Andrew Gower and Lacey Turner as fiancees Victor Frankenstein and Elizabeth Lavenza.

On 10 and 11 September 2011 the Kaiser Chiefs played two concerts at Kirkstall Abbey to a maximum audience of 10,000 on each day.

The BBC Television series Gunpowder (2017) used Kirkstall Abbey as a location.

See also

Grade I listed buildings in West Yorkshire
Listed buildings in Leeds (Kirkstall Ward)
Abbey House Museum
Architecture of Leeds

Notes

References

External links 

 Kirkstall Abbey official website
 Kirkstall Abbey on Kirkstall Online community website – history, description and photographs, predating recent restoration project

Religious organizations established in the 1150s
Cistercian monasteries in England
1150s establishments in England
Roman Catholic churches in Leeds
Listed buildings in Leeds
Grade I listed churches in Leeds
Grade I listed monasteries
Monasteries in West Yorkshire
Ruins in West Yorkshire
Museums in Leeds
Religious museums in England
Parks and commons in Leeds
Christian monasteries established in the 12th century
Scheduled monuments in West Yorkshire
1538 disestablishments in England
Ruined abbeys and monasteries
Grade I listed ruins
Abbey
Monasteries dissolved under the English Reformation